Isaac Oluwole (1852–1932) was a Nigerian bishop of Sierra Leonean and Egba heritage. He was one of the most prominent emigrants from Sierra Leone resident in Lagos during the second half of the nineteenth century. From 1879 to 1893, he was the principal of the CMS Grammar School, Lagos and was later ordained a priest.  During his time, he was one of the most loved among his peers of clergymen. A reason which may have led to his recommendation as a bishop after a leading radical candidate, James Johnson, complained about the neglect of indigenous control of the Church of Missionary Society.

Life

Oluwole was born in Abeokuta to a father of Ijebu heritage and mother from Ilesha. His parents were members of the Anglican Church in Abeokuta under Henry Townsend. He lost his father at the age of 13 and at the request of Townsend, he was placed under the care of Dr Harrison, a CMS missionary who was training other children in the region. Oluwole attended the Anglican elementary school in Ake, Abeokuta and continued his education at the Anglican Training Institution also in Abeokuta. When the school was moved to Lagos after protests against missionaries in Abeokuta, Oluwole continued his studies in Lagos. After completing his education, he taught for four years with the Anglican mission. 

In 1876, at the request of Rev. J.B. Wood, he was sponsored to attend Fourah Bay College where he ended up earning his bachelor's degree. Along with N.S. Davies and Obadiah Johnson, Oluwole was among the first students to obtain a bachelor's degree from the school in 1879 through the college's affiliation with the University of Durham. After the death of Rev T. B. Macaulay, a son-in-law of Bishop Ajayi Crowther in 1879, the Church Missionary Society chose to elect Oluwole as the new principal of C.M.S. Grammar School, Lagos. He was sent to England for further studies and spent one term at Monkton Combe School, which was founded in 1868 by a former curate to Sierra Leone, before taking the position.

He was ordained a deacon in 1881 and a priest in 1884. After the death of Bishop Crowther, CMS elected to nominate an Englishman as the new Bishop who will hold title of Bishop of Western Equatorial Africa and also chose to nominate two African assistant bishops. Rev. J. Sidney Hill was made bishop designate and following a preliminary mission undertaken by Hill, Oluwole and Rev. Charles Philips were nominated to become Assistant Bishops. In 1893, he was consecrated as the Assistant Bishop of Western Equatorial Africa at St Paul's Cathedral, London, Ludgate Hill on June 29, 1893 and was subsequently awarded a doctor of divinity degree from the University of Durham.

On December 13, 1893, Oluwole, Hill, Philips and 12 other English priests arrived in Lagos. However, Hill and his wife died shortly. Hill died on January 6, 1894, just after spending 24 days in Lagos. Herbert Tugwell was chosen as Hill's replacement. In 1920, the Diocese of Equatorial Africa was split into two, the Lagos and Diocese on the Niger. Oluwole's title was changed to Assistant Bishop of the Diocese of Lagos.

He married in 1888 and had six children, three of whom died before 1932. His son Isaac Ladipo Oluwole studied medicine at the University of Glasgow graduating MB ChB in 1918.

References

External links
Church of Nigeria history

19th-century Nigerian Anglican priests
Egba people
1852 births
1932 deaths
Yoruba Christian clergy
Sierra Leonean people of Yoruba descent
20th-century Nigerian Anglican priests
People from colonial Nigeria
Sierra Leonean emigrants to Nigeria
Heads of schools in Nigeria
19th-century Nigerian educators
Yoruba educators
Fourah Bay College alumni
people educated at Monkton Combe School
Anglican assistant bishops of Lagos